When the Heath Is in Bloom is a 1960 West German drama film directed by Hans Deppe and starring Joachim Hansen, Walter Richter, and Peter Carsten.

The film's art direction was by Willi Herrmann. It was shot at the Bendestorf Studios near Hamburg and on location on Lüneburg Heath.

Cast

References

Bibliography

External links 
 

1960 films
1960 drama films
German drama films
West German films
1960s German-language films
Films directed by Hans Deppe
1960s German films